Ana Stanić (born 8 December 1975) is a Serbian pop singer, songwriter, composer, and film producer.

Career

Music
In 1994, she became the singer in dance-pop duo Moby Dick. They recorded three albums, which sold in over 300,000 copies in FR Yugoslavia. They also had one sold-out concert in Sava Centar in Belgrade. As a member of duo, she wrote some of their most successful songs, like "Nostalgija" and "Nema nas više". Ana Stanić's family is part of the Vasojevići clan.

In 1998, Ana Stanić left Moby Dick, and started her successful solo career. First solo appearance happened on Budva Festival when she performed a song "Molila sam anđele", which she wrote together with Ivana Pavlović who later formed band Negative.

She recorded six studio albums: Metar iznad asfalta (1998), Ana Stanić (1999), Vidim te kad (1999), Tri (2000), U ogledalu (2004), Sudar (2008) and Priča za pamćenje (2015).

One of her fans is Serbian politician Božidar Đelić. He appeared on her presentation of Sudar in June 2008.

Charity work

Ana has been the ambassador for Dance4Life, an international organisation that rises awareness in AIDS prevention. She is current ambassador for MODS, child organisation in Serbia

Producing
In 1994, Stanić attended Academy of Dramatic Arts in Belgrade, class for film and TV production. She graduated in 2008.

Stanić produced the 2001 Serbian film Absolute 100, directed by Srdan Golubović. The film earned eight awards. She also had cameo appearance in few movies. She produced all of her numerous video clips, as well as some of her tv shows.

Solo discography 

Metar iznad asfalta
Year: 1998
Label: PGP RTS
Ana Stanić
Year: 1999
Label: Automatic Records
Vidim te kad
Year: 1999
Label: PGP RTS
Tri
Year: 2002
Label: PGP RTS
U ogledalu
Year: 2004
Label: City Records
Sudar
Year: 2008
Label: PGP RTS
Priča Za Pamćenje
Year: 2015
Label: Mascom Records

References

1975 births
Living people
Musicians from Niš
Serbian composers
21st-century Serbian women singers
Serbian film producers
Serbian pop singers
Serbian rock singers
Serbian singer-songwriters
20th-century Serbian women singers
Pesma za Evroviziju contestants